Nela "Nella" Vidaković (born 18 December 1981) is a Serbian pop-folk singer.

Personal life
Nela Vidakovic was born in Šabac, Serbia. At eight she began to attend music school to learn flute, and later enrolled at the Faculty of Music Arts in Belgrade. She graduated in 2006 and became B.Sc. Musician (professor of music and flute).

After graduation, she was employed at the State Music School in Loznica (Serbia) as a professor of the flute, and remains little more than a year. In 2007 she published her first studio solo album. 2011 two of her singer-songwriter songs were used in the movie "White lions" whose director, screenwriter and actor was Lazar Ristovski.  In 2015 she participated in the VIP Reality PAROVI on national television "Happy".

Discography
 Studio albums
 Crveni bmw (2007)
 Policija (2009)
 Beograd Luduje (2013)

 Singles
 Navika (2008)
 Bubašvaba (2011)
 Martini (2015)
 General (2016)
 Emirati (2017)
 Meni se ne udaje (2020)

References

External links
 Nela Vidaković tekstovi
 Nela Vidaković video
 Nela Vidaković Kurir
 Nela Vidakovic Alo
 Nela Vidakovic Blic
 Nela Vidakovic Svet
 Nela Vidakovic album no.1
 Nela Vidakovic album no.2

1981 births
Living people
Musicians from Šabac
Serbian turbo-folk singers
21st-century Serbian women singers